Kenkere Bailappa Siddaiah (2 March 1954 – 19 October 2019), commonly known as Prof. K. B. Siddaiah or simply KB, was an Indian poet, sociopolitical–philosopher, writer and social activist known for his works in Kannada language. For his contribution to Kannada literature, he was awarded the Karnataka Rajyotsava Award by the Government of Karnataka in 2013.

Personal life
Siddaiah was born in Kenkere in Tumkuru to Bailurappa and Anthuramma. He married Gangarajamma and had three children.

Career
Siddaiah started his career as an English lecturer and got involved in Dalit movement in Karnataka and became a prominent leader in the movement. He was one of the founding members of the Dalita Sangharsha Samiti.

Literary works
KB's poems were mostly based on social life of the marginalized people. His poems  including ’Ee naada manninalli’ inspired people across the state to join the Dalit movement. 

 Collections of poems
 Bakaala
 Daklakathadevi Kavya
 Anaatma 
 Gallebaani

 Prose
 Buddhana Naalku Shreshtasatyagalu
 Katthalodane Maathukathe

 Editions
 Dalitha Kavya

Death
Siddaiah met with a road accident and admitted in Manipal hospital in Bangalore and died eventually on 18 October in 2019. He was survived by his wife and 3 children.

Accolades
 2004 – Karnataka Sahitya Academy Award
 2013 – Karnataka Rajyotsava Award by Government of Karnataka
 2017 – President at the 12th Tumkur Jilla Kannada Sahitya Sammelana
 2018 – Ki. Ram. Nagaraj Award

References

Kannada-language writers
Kannada poets
People from Tumkur district
1954 births
2019 deaths